The Duncan Mountains are a group of rugged coastal foothills, about  long, extending from the mouth of Liv Glacier to the mouth of Strom Glacier at the head of the Ross Ice Shelf. They were discovered by the Byrd Antarctic Expedition in November 1929 and named for James Duncan, the Manager of Tapley Ltd, shipping agents for the Byrd expeditions at Dunedin, New Zealand.

See also
Pegmatite Point
Wishbone Ridge

References 

Mountain ranges of the Ross Dependency
Amundsen Coast